Ofir Akunis (born 28 May 1973) is an Israeli politician. He currently serves as a member of the Knesset for Likud and is the Minister of Science and Technology. He has previously held the posts of Minister of Labor, Social Affairs and Social Services in 2020, Minister of Science and Technology in 2015-2020 and Minister of Regional Cooperation in 2020-2021.

Biography

Early life
Akunis was born in Tel Aviv. His grandfather was a Greek-Jew who immigrated to Israel from Saloniki in 1934 and was a member of the Likud Party himself. His mother immigrated to Israel from Poland in 1957. He attended the Herzliya Hebrew High School between 1987 and 1991 and served as youth correspondent for the weekly "Ma'ariv LaNoar" magazine.

Akunis' mandatory military service was spent as a correspondent for the Chief Education Officer of the Education and Youth Corps. After his army service he served as music editor of the radio program "Youth Club" on Reshet Gimmel and on other programs. He completed a bachelor's degree in political science and international relations at the Open University.

In January 1992, he joined the Likud Party and began working in the information department at the party headquarters at Metzudat Ze'ev in Tel Aviv. In June 1996, Akunis was named deputy media advisor to newly-elected Prime Minister Binyamin Netanyahu and was later named spokesman for the Likud Party. 
In 2003 he won the Menachem Begin Award for his thesis "Morals and Realism in Israeli Politics". He later worked as a spokesman for the Minister of Justice, and in 2004 was appointed media advisor for Netanyahu when the latter served as finance minister.

Akunis continued to serve as Netanyahu's advisor until 2008 when he was appointed deputy director of communications and information for the Likud.

The 18th Knesset
Prior to the 2009 elections, Akunis participated in the primaries for the Likud and reached the 28th place. He submitted a petition to the election committee of the Likud together with other candidates. On 12 December 2008 the petition was accepted, and subsequently was promoted to the 26th place on the list, which is reserved for the Tel Aviv district. Post factum, it turned out that if the petition was not accepted, he would not have been elected to the Knesset, as the Likud won 27 mandates in the elections. Akunis was subsequently moved up to twenty-sixth place, and entered the Knesset as Likud won 27 seats.

During his first two years as a Knesset member, Ofir Akunis served as Chairman of the Economic Committee. He was also appointed Deputy Speaker of the House.
After the flotilla to Gaza, Ofir Akunis confronted the Knesset members of the Balad party several times, and even announced several times that as the Likud's representative to the Central Elections Committee he would demand the disqualification of their list and the disqualification of MK Hanin Zuabi, who participated in the flotilla.
After recruiting a majority of 19 supporters against 9 opponents, the Central Elections Committee disqualified Zuabi from running for the 19th Knesset. During a pre-vote debate, Akunis said, "Zuabi did not stop undermining the State of Israel, and openly incited against it and against IDF soldiers. He participated in the flotilla, do you need any more than that to disqualify her candidacy?" After a few days, the Supreme Court overturned the decision.
According to the statistics of the Knesset Ofir Akunis is considered a very active member, both in the Knesset plenum and in the committees in which he participates.

Economic Committee Activities
During his service as Chairman of the Economic Committee, Ofir Akunis collaborated with the Minister of Communications Moshe Kahlon in opening the cellular communications market to competition, including supporting a decrease in link fees and adding virtual operators and new companies to this market. He promoted the consumer cash refund law and initiated the reverse interest law. In the television sector he promoted legislation regulating the transition from franchises to licenses, and initiated the increase of channels broadcast free of charge by the "Idan+" DDT broadcasting service. He objected to the Ministry of Finance's demand to increase radio and television fees, and actually lead to its decrease.

In discussions led by the committee on state royalties on oil and gas profits, Akunis objected to the new fund's initiative to increase royalties to 80%. However, after the publication of the Shinsky Committee's recommendations, the Knesset voted in favor of the "Oil Profit Tax Law."

Legislation

Ofir Akunis promoted consumer, civilian and political related legislation, among them:
 Legislation enabling parking at bus stations on holidays
 Legislation providing free water saving devices ("chaschamim")
 Legislation prohibiting cable and satellite broadcasting companies to charge fines for terminating services
 In December 2010 an amendment to the Flag and State Symbol Law was approved, stipulating that State flags must be manufactured in Israel. The amendment was submitted together with MK Shelly Yechimovitch and other MKs
 Proposed legislation requiring a referendum to be held for any future political agreement with the Palestinian Authority regarding the future of Yehuda and Shomron
 MK Akunis is one of the initiators of the "Embargo Prohibition Law", the purpose of which is to prevent any party banning Israel to benefit from financing or services provided by the State, including prohibiting their entrance into the country

Additional functions in the Knesset and the Likud
 Member of the Foreign Affairs and Defense Committee
 Member of the State Inspection Committee
 Member of the Children's Rights Committee
 Joint Chairman (together with MK Shai Chermesh) of the "Knesset Forum for International Relations " lobby
 Chairman of the Committee for issues relating to the Second Television and Radio Authority
 Chairman of the Likud's response team
 Likud's representative in the Central Elections Committee

The 19th Knesset
In 2013 Akunis placed 18th on the Likud Party's election slate for the 19th Knesset, but was dropped to number 29 after the party decided to run on a joint ticket with the Yisrael Beteinu party. Nevertheless, Akunis was re-elected and appointed Deputy Minister in the Prime Minister's Office, acting as the liaison between the government and the Knesset with the portfolio of the Advancement of Young People and Students. As the liaison between the government and the Knesset, Akunis responded to opposition-sponsored motions of no confidence on behalf of the government. He also spoke much about "Prawer plan,"  negotiations with the Palestinians and with Israeli towns in the disputed territories. .

Deputy Minister of Environmental Protection 
On 9 December 2014, Akunis was appointed Deputy Minister of Environmental Protection. Akunis replaced Amir Peretz, who resigned from his post as Minister. The appointment, made by the Prime Minister Benjamin Netanyahu's office, came a week after the massive crude oil spill in Israel's Arava region. Akunis said that "it is the Deputy Minister's intention to prioritize treatment of the ecological disaster in the south and to do all that is necessary to prevent the spread of the crude oil, and to prevent a health and environmental disaster." Akunis ordered crews to raise the side walls of the dams that had been built in the Arava to prevent flooding. Thanks to the infrastructure that had already been built in the area, the risk that the oil would reach the Gulf of Eilat significantly dropped. Akunis instructed that the reserve remain closed as long as high values of pollutants were still registered in air quality tests. In the end of December, the government approved a NIS 17 million Environment Ministry plan to rehabilitate. According to Akunis, the NIS 17 million program would serve to treat the soils contaminated by the spill as well as help restore the wildlife populations damaged over the course of the event. As part of the plan, a special team would be appointed to evaluate the environmental impact of various Eilat-Ashkelon Pipeline Company activities on both dry land and beaches. The approved plan also involved opening a closed Eilat beach on EAPC-owned property to the city's residents and visitors. In January 2015, Air quality tests found that there has been a 90% reduction of pollution in Evrona.
In July 2017, the beach opened as promised.

"Computer for Every Child" 
For his own request, Akunis was appointed by Binyamin Netanyahu to lead the 'Computer for Every Child' project. He said that "This is one of the most important social projects taking place in Israel," and added "that reducing the technological gaps is a critical element in reducing social disparities." Akunis promised that he will work to "promote, strengthen and upgrade" the project. During 2013, the project has been upgraded from "Computer for Every Child" to "Tablet for the Whole Classroom" and Tablets Distributed to Children of Sderot, Ofakim, Lod etc. In October 2014, Akunis announced that the government had allocated NIS 1.8 million to provide tablets for each and every child living in the south.

The 20th Knesset
Prior to the 2015 elections, Akunis participated in the primaries for the Likud and reached the 15th place.

On 14 May 2015 Akunis was sworn in as a Minister in the 34th Government of Israel.

In June 2015, Akunis was authorized by the Prime Minister to be the Broadcasting Authority and the Second Television and Radio Authority. After his appointment, Bezeq led to changes in the Public Broadcastibng Law. The changes included renaming the law to the "Israeli Public Broadcasting Law" and final cancellation of the television fee. These changes were criticized by his predecessor, Minister Gilad Erdan, and received support from the Ministry of Finance and The New General Workers Union.

Following a controversy with the Prime Minister, he resigned as head of the Broadcasting Authority and the Second Television and Radio Authority.

Minister of Science and Technology

On 2 September 2015, Akunis was appointed Ministry of Science and Technology replacing Danny Danon who was appointed Israel's envoy to the United Nations.

In July 2018, Akunis refused to approve a recommendation from his office to appoint Professor Yael Amitai to the Board of Governors of the German-Israeli Foundation for Scientific Research and Development, stating that in 2005 Amitai signed a petition supporting the refusal to serve in the territories. The academy was harshly criticized for this decision, but Akunis adhered to his decision. Prof. Amitai and the heads of universities filed a petition with the High Court against this decision by Akunis. The Attorney General and the State Attorney's Office filed suit against Akunis, but at the court hearing he continued to hold his position. Due to opposition from the Attorney General to give Akunis an outside legal representation, he decided to represent himself in court and appeared at every Supreme Court hearing and argued before the panel. Amitai eventually accepted the appointment of Akunis' replacement, Izhar Shay.

In January 2020, he was appointed Minister of Labor, Welfare and Social Services instead of the Prime Minister.

The 23rd Knesset
On the 35th day of the new Israeli government (in 2020), Prime Minister Benjamin Netanyahu announced that Akunis would be appointed Minister of Regional Cooperation while Gilad Erdan, who held the position before Akunis, was appointed Israeli Ambassador to the United Nations.

The 24th Knesset
Akunis was suggested as the Minister of Justice after the Supreme Court demanded that the empty post of Justice Minister be filled within 48 hours. A vote in the cabinet on this nomination was ruled illegal by Attorney General Avichai Mandelblit and also the Israeli Supreme Court. When Benny Gantz was subsequently approved by the cabinet in a legal vote, Akunis abstained from voting as a form of protest.

Personal life
Ofir Akunis is married to Adi and father of their two children. He is a resident of Tel Aviv-Yafo.

References

External links

1973 births
Living people
Deputy ministers of Israel
Deputy Speakers of the Knesset
Government ministers of Israel
Ministers of Science of Israel
Herzliya Hebrew Gymnasium alumni
Israeli Jews
Israeli people of Greek-Jewish descent
Israeli people of Polish-Jewish descent
Jewish Israeli politicians
Likud politicians
Members of the 18th Knesset (2009–2013)
Members of the 19th Knesset (2013–2015)
Members of the 20th Knesset (2015–2019)
Members of the 21st Knesset (2019)
Members of the 22nd Knesset (2019–2020)
Members of the 23rd Knesset (2020–2021)
Members of the 24th Knesset (2021–2022)
Members of the 25th Knesset (2022–)
People from Tel Aviv